Channel V at the Hard Rock Live may refer to:

 Channel V at the Hard Rock Live (Mr. Big album), 1996
 Channel V at the Hard Rock Live (Richard Marx album), 1995